The Ordesa Valley is a glacial valley in Aragon, in the Spanish Pyrenees which forms part of the Ordesa y Monte Perdido National Park. It was first discovered in 1820, but not mapped in detail until approximately the 1920s.

The valley's east–west orientation, unusual in the Pyrenees, opens it to influence from the Atlantic Ocean and gives it a moderate climate. It has one of Europe's largest populations of the Pyrenean Chamois and is well known for its waterfalls and wildlife.

Monte Perdido (3,355 m) is the third highest mountain in the Pyrenees and together with Cilindro de Marboré (3,328 m) and Soum de Ramond (3,263 m) can be seen at the north-east end of the valley. The name Monte Perdido (lost mountain) was given because the peak could not be seen from the French side of the range.

References

External links 

 Website of Ordesa y Monte Perdido National Park
 Satellite image from Google Maps

Valleys of Spain
Pyrenees
Geography of the Province of Huesca
Landforms of Aragon